Ulenspiegel is an opera by Walter Braunfels to a libretto by the composer after Charles de Coster's The Legend of Thyl Ulenspiegel and Lamme Goedzak. It premiered in Stuttgart's Hoftheater on 4 November 1913.

Braunfels' work was banned during the Nazi era and the first revival of Ulenspiegel took place 28 January 2011 in Gera.

Recording
DVD - Marc Horus, Christa Ratzenböck, Joachim Goltz, Hans-Peter Scheidegger, Saeyoung Park, Laszlo Kiss, EntArteOpera Choir, Israel Chamber Orchestra,  Martin Sieghart.

References

Operas
1913 operas
Operas by Walter Braunfels
Till Eulenspiegel
Operas based on novels
Adaptations of works by Charles De Coster